Songs of Tragedy is a studio album by country music singer Hank Snow. It was released in 1964 by RCA Victor (catalog LSP-2901). The album was produced by Chet Atkins. It is built around the concept of tragedy, focusing on "prisoners praying for redemption and war-weary soldiers."

The album debuted on Billboard magazine's country album chart on January 18, 1964, peaked at No. 7, and remained on the chart for a total of 26 weeks. It included two Top 10 hits: "The Last Ride" (No. 3) and "Big Wheels" (No. 7).

AllMusic gave the album a rating of three stars.

Track listing
Side A
 "The Prisoner's Song"
 "The Color Song"
 "The Answer to Little Blossom"
 "There's a Star Spangled Banner Waving Somewhere"
 "Walking the Last Mile"
 "Old Rover"

Side B
 "The Prisoner's Dream"
 "Put Your Arms Around Me"
 "Your Little Band of Gold"
 "Rocking Alone in an Old Rocking Chair"
 "Mother I Thank You (For the Bible You Gave)"
 "Little Joe"

References

1964 albums
Hank Snow albums
RCA Victor albums